Januš Štrukelj (born 8 April 1991) is a Slovenian former footballer who played as a goalkeeper.

References

External links
NZS profile 

1991 births
Living people
Slovenian footballers
Association football goalkeepers
ND Gorica players
NK Brda players
Slovenian PrvaLiga players